Smaragdina affinis is a species of short-horned leaf beetles belonging to the family Chrysomelidae, subfamily Clytrinae.

Subspecies
 Smaragdina affinis affinis  (Illiger, 1794) 
 Smaragdina affinis manicata  (Lacordaire, 1848)  - in Spain

Description

Head is shiny black. Elytrae are black, with bluish reflections. Pronotum is edged with orange-red or red-brown, while the disc is black. Pronotum shows a fine and sparse punctuation, with strong and dense punctuation on the elytrae. Tibia and tarsi are orange. Femurs are hardly darkened at the base.

Biology
Adults mainly feed on leaves of Corylus avellana, Quercus and Crataegus species, while larvae possibly feed in leaf litter.

Distribution
These leaf beetles are present in most of Europe.

Habitat
These leaf beetles are heat-loving. They can be found predominantly in thickets and forest edges, in the plane or on dry warm slopes, from about April to July.

References

External links
 Naturspaziergang
 Beetles and beetle recording in Great Britain
 Entomoland

Clytrina
Beetles of Europe
Taxa named by Johann Karl Wilhelm Illiger
Beetles described in 1794